José Alejandro Barrondo Xuc (born 16 September 1996) is a Guatemalan race walker, he has qualified to represent Guatemala at the 2020 Summer Olympics. He is from San Cristóbal Verapaz.

International Competitions

References

External links
 

People from Alta Verapaz Department
Guatemalan male racewalkers
1996 births
Living people
Olympic athletes of Guatemala
Athletes (track and field) at the 2020 Summer Olympics
Pan American Games medalists in athletics (track and field)
Pan American Games bronze medalists for Guatemala
Medalists at the 2019 Pan American Games
Athletes (track and field) at the 2019 Pan American Games
20th-century Guatemalan people
21st-century Guatemalan people